Formosa maritima is a Gram-negative, strictly aerobic, rod-shaped and motile bacterium from the genus Formosa which has been isolated from sediments from the coast of Weihai in China.

References

Flavobacteria
Bacteria described in 2020